John Kimball (September 30, 1796 – February 23, 1884) was a New Hampshire and Vermont attorney and politician who served in the New Hampshire House of Representatives and the Vermont House of Representatives.  He also served as President of the Vermont State Senate.

Biography
John Kimball was born in Haverhill, New Hampshire on September 30, 1796.  He graduated from Kimball Union Academy and Dartmouth College (class of 1822), studied law with Moses P. Payson, and became an attorney in Claremont.  A Whig, Kimball served in the New Hampshire House of Representatives from 1838 to 1839.

In 1839 Kimball relocated to Putney, Vermont, where he continued to practice law.   From 1844 to 1846 he was Windham County State's Attorney.

From 1846 to 1849 Kimball served in the Vermont Senate.  From 1848 to 1849 he was the Senate's President pro tem.

Now a Republican, Kimball served in the Vermont House of Representatives from 1856 to 1857, and again in 1864.

Kimball died in Putney on February 3, 1884.

Personal
In 1834 John Kimball married Frances Mary White, the daughter of Phineas White.

References

1796 births
1884 deaths
Dartmouth College alumni
People from Haverhill, New Hampshire
People from Claremont, New Hampshire
People from Windham County, Vermont
New Hampshire lawyers
Vermont lawyers
State's attorneys in Vermont
New Hampshire Whigs
19th-century American politicians
Vermont Whigs
Vermont Republicans
Members of the New Hampshire House of Representatives
Members of the Vermont House of Representatives
Vermont state senators
Presidents pro tempore of the Vermont Senate
19th-century American lawyers